Balud, officially the Municipality of Balud,  is a 4th class municipality in the province of Masbate, Philippines. According to the 2020 census, it has a population of 40,155 people.

The name Balud came from the name of the Pink-bellied imperial pigeon (Ducula poliocephala).

History
Balud was created as a municipality through Executive Order No. 244 signed by President Elpidio Quirino on July 18, 1949.

Geography

Barangays
Balud is politically subdivided into 32 barangays.

Climate

Demographics

Economy

References

External links
 [ Philippine Standard Geographic Code]
2000 Philippine Census Information
Local Governance Performance Management System

Municipalities of Masbate
Establishments by Philippine executive order